Justin Brian Melton (born April 7, 1987), popularly known as QuickMelt,  Mouse,  The Flying Minion, and Minion,  is a Filipino-American professional basketball player who last played for the Blackwater Bossing of the Philippine Basketball Association (PBA). He was drafted 13th overall by the San Mig Coffee Mixers in the 2013 PBA draft.

Early career
Justin Melton played high school basketball at Tabb High School in Yorktown, Virginia. After playing one year of junior varsity basketball, Melton played three years of varsity basketball, capturing Bay Rivers District 1st Team Honors in his junior and senior seasons. In his senior season, he was awarded Bay Rivers District "Player of the Year," along with 1st Team All-Region and All-State honors. Melton also excelled in track and field, placing 2nd in the Virginia High School AA State Track Meet in the triple jump event with a distance of 45 feet 6 inches.

Melton studied and played basketball on a full scholarship at Mount Olive College, in Mount Olive, North Carolina where he was very successful. Justin was a very tough player in college and was the leader and motor of the team for the last 3 seasons. He is extremely athletic can finish strong at the rim. He shot over 40 percent from the 3-point line in his senior year. Melton possessed above-average athleticism for a person of his size and was very quick. He is also featured on his college's official website because of being featured on a Yahoo! Sports article.

He played more than 20 minutes a game in his college years.

Professional career

Artur Nogueira - SP (Clinesp Artur Nogueira)
He played in Brazil for the AABI CLineSP Artur Nogueira, made great games being fundamental for the conquest of the Paulista championship, but the team went bankrupt and he was waived.

ABL
He played for Malaysia in the ASEAN Basketball League, as an import.

PBA
Melton was picked 13th overall by the Mixers in the 2013 PBA draft. Melton was noticed as one of the most athletic players in his draft class, and he showcased that athleticism very fast with his teammates. Though measured at just 5-foot-9 in socks, Melton finished with several rim-rattling slams during practice. His energy was also on display on defense.
Melton struggled in his first conference, the 2013–14 PBA Philippine Cup, due to injuries on the finger, but bounced back and even won the Best Player of the Game honors.

He shocked the whole PBA, by winning the 2014 PBA All-Star Weekend Slam Dunk Contest held in the Mall of Asia Arena. He and Rey Guevarra had a head-to-head matchup on that battle, they have been tied for three rounds on the championship round, at last, they have been declared co-champions, because the process is going on and on.

He has a high vertical leap, which allows him to jump very high despite of his 5'9" height. Melton is also a decent outside shooter, who shot at 67% in his first season.

On November 25, 2021, Melton, along with Kyle Pascual, was traded to the Terrafirma Dyip for James Laput.

On December 24, 2021, after only playing three games for the Dyip, Melton was traded to the Blackwater Bossing for Ed Daquioag. Melton became an unrestricted free agent on February 1, 2023.

PBA career statistics

As of the end of 2022–23 season

Season-by-season averages

|-
| align=left | 
| align=left | San Mig Super Coffee
| 59 || 14.9 || .384 || .306 || .820 || 2.1 || 1.3 || .8 || .2 || 4.1
|-
| align=left | 
| align=left | Purefoods / Star
| 41 || 15.6 || .396 || .308 || .650 || 2.9 || 1.5 || .7 || .2 || 4.4
|-
| align=left | 
| align=left | Star
| 33 || 21.2 || .319 || .263 || .730 || 2.8 || 2.4 || 1.0 || .1 || 5.7
|-
| align=left | 
| align=left | Star
| 49 || 21.2 || .370 || .371 || .750 || 2.5 || 1.9 || .9 || .2 || 5.1
|-
| align=left | 
| align=left | Magnolia
| 44 || 20.6 || .376 || .352 || .667 || 3.5 || 2.2 || 1.2 || .1 || 5.5
|-
| align=left | 
| align=left | Magnolia
| 52 || 20.6 || .288 || .277 || .625 || 3.0 || 1.6 || 1.0 || .0 || 3.8
|-
| align=left | 
| align=left | Magnolia
| 12 || 15.3 || .367 || .360 || .000 || 1.3 || .8 || 1.0 || .0 || 2.6
|-
| align=left rowspan=3| 
| align=left | Magnolia
| rowspan=3|20 || rowspan=3|11.0 || rowspan=3|.233 || rowspan=3|.212 || rowspan=3|– || rowspan=3|1.3 || rowspan=3|1.0 || rowspan=3|.7 || rowspan=3|.0 || rowspan=3|1.4
|-
| align=left | Terrafirma
|-
| align=left | Blackwater
|-
| align=left | 
| align=left | Blackwater
| 18 || 16.4 || .278 || .242 || – || 2.3 || 1.8 || 1.1 || .0 || 2.1
|-class=sortbottom
| align=center colspan=2 | Career
| 328 || 18.1 || .347 || .310 || .713 || 2.6 || 1.7 || .9 || .1 || 4.2

References

1987 births
Living people
American men's basketball players
Basketball players from Pampanga
Blackwater Bossing players
Filipino emigrants to the United States
Filipino expatriate basketball people in Malaysia
Filipino men's basketball players
Filipino people of African-American descent
Kuala Lumpur Dragons players
Magnolia Hotshots draft picks
Magnolia Hotshots players
Mount Olive Trojans men's basketball players
Philippine Basketball Association All-Stars
Point guards
Sportspeople from Angeles City
Tabb High School alumni
Terrafirma Dyip players